Phyllis Christine Cast (born April 30, 1960) is an American romance/fantasy author, known for the   House of Night series she writes and her daughter Kristin Cast edits, as well as her own Goddess Summoning and Partholon book series.

Career
On her own, P.C. Cast is known for her Goddess Summoning and Partholon book series.  Her first book, Goddess by Mistake, originally published in 2001, won the Prism, Holt Medallion, and Laurel Wreath awards, and was a finalist for the National Readers' Choice Award; her subsequent books have also won a variety of prizes.

In 2005, she and her daughter began co-writing the  House of Night series. In the wake of the current popularity of vampire fiction led by Stephenie Meyer's Twilight series, the Casts' books have enjoyed substantial and increasing critical and commercial success, and in March 2009, the fifth book in their series, Hunted, opened at number one on the best-seller lists of USA Today and The Wall Street Journal.

According to P.C. Cast, the concept for the House of Night novels came from her agent, who suggested the theme "vampire finishing school."  The books take place in an alternative universe version of Tulsa, Oklahoma inhabited by both humans and "vampyres" (Cast uses this alternative spelling in the books, explaining it as a choice she made "just 'cause I like the way it looks").  The protagonist, Zoey Redbird, age 16, is "marked" as a "fledgling" and moves to the "House of Night" school to undergo her transformation.

In November 2008, Variety reported that producers Michael Birnbaum and Jeremiah S. Chechik had obtained an option to acquire the motion picture rights in the House of Night series.  No film resulted from this, and in November 2011, it was announced that the film rights had been acquired by producer Samuel Hadida's company, Davis Films.

Personal life
Born in Watseka, Illinois, Cast now lives in Oregon. She also lived in Tulsa where she taught high school English and where her daughter was a student at the University of Tulsa.

Influence

One of Cast's former students is horror journalist and novelist Preston Fassel, who calls Cast his "earliest writing mentor" and cites her as an influence on his novel Our Lady of the Inferno.

Published works

Goddess Summoning
Goddess of the Sea, Berkley, 2003.
Goddess of Spring, Berkley, 2004
Goddess of Light, Berkley, 2005
Goddess of the Rose, Berkley, 2006
Goddess of Love, Berkley, 2007
Warrior Rising, Berkley, 2008
Goddess of Troy, 2011 [Reissue of Warrior Rising]
Goddess of Legend, Berkeley, 2010

Partholon
The Divine Series (also known as the Partholon Series) was Cast's earliest work, with the first entry, Goddess by Mistake, published in 2001 by the independent press Hawk Publishing. The series follows Shannon Parker, a high school English teacher from Oklahoma who swaps places with Rhiannon, a High Priestess of the goddess Epona from Partholon, a quasi-Greco-Celtic parallel world/dimension populated by humans, centaurs, and monsters known as Fomorians. Following Cast's later success, the original entry was rereleased under the title Divine by Mistake, and followed by a sequel, Divine by Choice, in 2006. Two further entries in the series followed in 2007 and 2009.

Divine by Mistake or Goddess by Mistake, August 28, 2001
Elphame's Choice, November 24, 2004
Brighid's Quest, November 29, 2005
Divine by Choice, November 21, 2006
Divine by Blood, August 28, 2007
Divine Beginnings, October 1, 2009 [Series Prequel]

House of Night

 Marked,  St. Martin's May 28, 2007
 Betrayed, St. Martin's October 2, 2007
 Chosen, St. Martin's March 4, 2008
 Untamed, St. Martin's September 23, 2008
 Hunted, St. Martin's March 10, 2009
 Tempted, St. Martin's October 27, 2009
 Burned, St. Martin's April 27, 2010
 Awakened, St. Martin's January 4, 2011
 Dragon's Oath, St. Martin's July 12, 2011 [Novella]
 Destined, St. Martin's October 25, 2011
 Lenobia's Vow, St. Martin's January 31, 2012 [Novella]
 Hidden, St. Martin's October 16, 2012
 Neferet's Curse, St. Martin's February 19, 2013 [Novella]
 Revealed, St. Martin's October 15, 2013
 Kalona's Fall, St. Martin's, July 29, 2014 [Novella]
 Redeemed, St. Martin's, October 14, 2014

House of Night: Other World
 Loved, Blackstone Publishing, July 11, 2017
 Lost, Blackstone Publishing, July 10, 2018
Forgotten, Blackstone Publishing, October 29, 2019
Found, Blackstone Publishing, July 7, 2020

Related Books
 The Fledgling Handbook or The Fledgling Handbook 101,  St. Martin's October 26, 2010
 Nyx In The House Of Night, BenBella Books June 7, 2011
 House of Night: Legacy, Dark Horse Comics, July 10, 2021

Time Raiders

The Avenger, October 1, 2009

Tales of a New World
Moon Chosen, October 18, 2016
 Sun Warrior, October 17, 2017
Wind Rider, October 16, 2018

Dysasters
The Dysasters, February 26, 2019
The Rage of Storms, TBA

Dysasters: Graphic Novel 

 The Dysasters: A Graphic Novel, Wednesday Books, February 25, 2020

Sisters of Salem 

 Spells Trouble, St. Martin's, May 25, 2021
 Omens Bite, St. Martin's (ISBN 9781250765666), April 5, 2022

Anthologies and collections
After Moonrise, Harlequin, October 23, 2012

 "Possessed" by P.C. Cast
 "Haunted" by Gena Showalter

Mysteria 
Mysteria, Berkley, July 5, 2006

 "Mortal in Mysteria" by Susan Grant
 "Alone Wolf" by MaryJanice Davidson
 "The Witches of Mysteria and the Dead Who Love Them" by Gena Showalter
 "Candy Cox and the Big Bad (Were)Wolf" by P.C. Cast

Mysteria Lane, Berkley, October 7, 2008

 "Disdaining Trouble" by MaryJanice Davidson
 "The Nanny from Hell" by Susan Grant
 "A Tawdry Affair" by Gena Showalter
 "It's In His Kiss" by PC Cast

Mysteria Nights, Berkley, July 5, 2011 [Omnibus Reissue]

 Collects the eight previous stories collected in both Mysteria and Mysteria Lane.

Accidental Magic, Berkley, September 4, 2012

 Collects both novellas "Candy Cox and the Big Bad (Were)Wolf" and "It's In His Kiss" by author P.C. Cast

Love Stories with Bite, Edited by P.C. Cast 
Immortal: Love Stories with Bite, BenBella Books, August 1, 2008

 "Haunted Love" by Cynthia Leitich Smith
 "Amber Smoke" by Kristen Cast
 "Dead Man Stalking" by Rachel Caine
 "Table Manners" by Tanith Lee
 "Changed" by Nancy Holder
 "Blue Moon" by Richelle Mead
 "Free" by Claudia Gray

Eternal: More Love Stories with Bite, BenBella Books, November 2, 2010

 "Bloodshed" by Claudia Gray
 "Say Yes" by Lili St. Crow
 "The Other Side" by Heather Brewer
 "Letters to Romeo" by Nancy Holder
 "Drama Queen’s Last Dance" by Rachel Caine
 "Thief" by Jeri Smith-Ready

References

External links

1960 births
Living people
21st-century American novelists
American fantasy writers
American romantic fiction writers
American women novelists
Writers from Tulsa, Oklahoma
House of Night series
American writers of young adult literature
People from Watseka, Illinois
Women science fiction and fantasy writers
Women romantic fiction writers
21st-century American women writers
Women writers of young adult literature
Novelists from Oklahoma